Miguel Ángel Tapias Dávila (born 9 January 1997) is a Mexican professional footballer who plays as a centre-back for Major League Soccer club Minnesota United.

Club career
Tapias joined the Pachuca youth system at the age of 11, and progressed through the under–15, under–17 and under–20 squads.

Tapias was loaned out to Ascenso MX club Mineros de Zacatecas in the summer of 2016. He made his professional debut in their first match of the Apertura 2016 season, a 1–0 victory over FC Juárez on 16 July. He made 32 appearances for Zacatecas over the next two years, starting in all but one, before returning to Pachuca in June 2018. First-team manager Pako Ayestarán handed Tapias his Liga MX debut on 21 July; he played the full 90 minutes of a 1–0 defeat to Monterrey at centre-back. He scored his first goal two months later in a league win against Cruz Azul at home. On 23 October, Tapias scored against Monterrey in the opening minutes of the Apertura 2018 Copa MX semi-final match, which Pachuca lost in penalties after a 3–3 draw.

In February 2020, Tapias was named to the Liga MX team of the week for the first time in round four of the Clausura 2020 season.

Career statistics

Club

Honours
Pachuca
Liga MX: Apertura 2022

References

External links
 
 

1997 births
Living people
Mexico youth international footballers
Association football wingers
Association football central defenders
C.F. Pachuca players
Mineros de Zacatecas players
Minnesota United FC players
Major League Soccer players
Liga MX players
Ascenso MX players
Liga Premier de México players
Tercera División de México players
Footballers from Sonora
Sportspeople from Hermosillo
21st-century Mexican people
Mexican footballers